1045 Michela, provisional designation , is an stony Massalian asteroid from the inner regions of the asteroid belt, approximately  kilometers in diameter. It was discovered on 19 November 1924, by Belgian–American astronomer George Van Biesbroeck at the Yerkes Observatory in  Williams Bay, Wisconsin, United States. The S-type asteroid was named after the discoverer's daughter, Micheline van Biesbroeck.

Orbit and classification 

Michela is a member of the Massalia family, a very large inner belt asteroid family consisting of stony asteroids. It orbits the Sun in the inner main-belt at a distance of 2.0–2.7 AU once every 3 years and 7 months (1,323 days; semi-major axis of 2.36 AU). Its orbit has an eccentricity of 0.16 and an inclination of 0° with respect to the ecliptic.

Physical characteristics 

In the SMASS classification, Michela is a common, stony S-type asteroid, which is also the overall spectral type for Massalian asteroids.

Diameter and albedo 

According to the survey carried out by the NEOWISE mission of NASA's Wide-field Infrared Survey Explorer, Michela measures 6.104 kilometers in diameter  and its surface has an albedo of 0.328.

Rotation period 

As of 2018, no rotational lightcurve of Michela has been obtained from photometric observations. The body's rotation period, poles and shape remain unknown.

Naming 

This minor planet was named after Micheline van Biesbroeck, daughter of the discoverer George Van Biesbroeck. The official naming citation was mentioned in The Names of the Minor Planets by Paul Herget in 1955.

References

External links 
 Asteroid Lightcurve Database (LCDB), query form (info )
 Dictionary of Minor Planet Names, Google books
 Asteroids and comets rotation curves, CdR – Observatoire de Genève, Raoul Behrend
 Discovery Circumstances: Numbered Minor Planets (1)-(5000) – Minor Planet Center
 
 

001045
Discoveries by George Van Biesbroeck
Named minor planets
001045
19241119